Lanivtsi Raion was a raion in Ternopil Oblast in western Ukraine. Its administrative center was Lanivtsi. The raion was abolished on 18 July 2020 as part of the administrative reform of Ukraine, which reduced the number of raions of Ternopil Oblast to three. The area of Lanivtsi Raion was merged into Kremenets Raion. The last estimate of the raion population was

Subdivisions
At the time of disestablishment, the raion consisted of two hromadas:
 Borsuky rural hromada with the administration in the selo  of Borsuky;
 Lanivtsi urban hromada with the administration in Lanivtsi.

Villages in Raion 
 Bilozirka (population 1,102)
Moskalivka (population 582)

See also
 Subdivisions of Ukraine

References

Former raions of Ternopil Oblast
1939 establishments in Ukraine
Ukrainian raions abolished during the 2020 administrative reform